Victor Montori (born 1970) is a professor of medicine at the Mayo Clinic in Rochester, Minnesota, USA. He was born and raised in Lima, Peru. He completed medical school at Universidad Peruana Cayetano Heredia in Peru, before joining the Internal Medicine Residency Program at the Mayo Clinic. He was named Chief Resident of the Department of Internal Medicine from 1999 to 2000. 

Following his residency training, he began a research fellowship in endocrinology at the Mayo Clinic and obtained a master's degree in biomedical research from the Mayo Graduate School. Montori became interested in evidence-based medicine. He then spent two years at McMaster University in Canada, where he was a research fellowship under Gordon Guyatt as a Mayo Foundation Scholar.

At the Mayo Clinic, Dr. Montori is currently a lead investigator of the Knowledge and Evaluation Research (KER) Unit. The KER Unit takes a variety of approaches to the interactions between patients and clinicians to help them better understand and find treatments that respond to the concerns of them and their family. To help better understand this question and the challenges it presents Dr. Montori has gathered a multidisciplinary team of researchers. 

These researchers work on one of three aspects of understanding the problem:

 What does the medical evidence say? (Systematic reviews and meta-analyses) 
 What do patients want? (Understanding the clinical encounter and facilitation of communication through shared decision making) 
 How does this fit into patients' lives? (Minimally disruptive medicine). 

Dr. Montori has also been integral in the Patient Revolution Initiative, which hopes to transform healthcare through creating conversations between patients and providers.

Dr. Montori is a recognized teacher of evidence-based medicine, promoting the ideals of incorporating the best available research evidence, the patient’s context, and the patient's values and preferences in making clinical decisions. He has been an active contributor to the Users’ Guides to the Medical Literature. In his lecture "The End of Evidence-based Medicine" he presents the idea that the corruption of research (e.g., stopping clinical trials earlier than planned) and the way doctors practice today (without taking into account the values, goals, expectations, and preferences of patients) is signaling the end of evidence-based medicine, and that the solution lies in using the techniques of evidence-based medicine to assess (a) how believable the results of scientific studies are, (b) how hyped the results are, (c) and how to apply those results to patients.

Dr. Montori has won an American Diabetes Association Clinical Research Award and has developed diabetes medication cards that can help patients with diabetes make better choices about their drugs.  In addition, he has promoted the measurement of important patient outcomes in diabetes trials and a focus on cardiovascular risk reduction rather than glycemic control in the care of these patients with type 2 diabetes.

Dr. Montori also serves as director of research and education for the acclaimed SPARC Innovation Program at the Mayo Clinic, the first service research and development laboratory in healthcare.  In this capacity he is said to have the ability to cross "back and forth between design and research with fluency".

Montori is recognized for promoting the practice of evidence-based medicine in endocrinology and diabetes care.  He has edited two volumes on the topic and has published nearly 500 manuscripts. Montori also collaborated in the development of Minimally Disruptive Medicine and Normalization Process Theory.

References

External links

 KER Unit Homepage
 Mayo Clinic

1970 births
Living people
People from Lima
Peruvian medical researchers